Dimidamus is a genus of spiders in the family Nicodamidae. It was first described in 1995 by Harvey. , it contains 6 species from New Guinea and Australia.

Species
Dimidamus comprises the following species:
Dimidamus arau Harvey, 1995
Dimidamus dimidiatus (Simon, 1897)
Dimidamus enaro Harvey, 1995
Dimidamus leopoldi (Roewer, 1938)
Dimidamus sero Harvey, 1995
Dimidamus simoni Harvey, 1995

References

Nicodamidae
Araneomorphae genera
Spiders of Australia
Spiders of Oceania